Rydberg Peninsula is a broad ice-covered peninsula,  long, between Fladerer Bay and Carroll Inlet, Palmer Land. Rydberg Peninsula was mapped by the United States Geological Survey (USGS) from surveys and U.S. Navy air photos, 1961–1966. Rydberg Peninsula was named by the United States Advisory Committee on Antarctic Names (US-ACAN) for Captain Sven Rydberg, commander of USNS Eltanin on Antarctic cruises, February 1962 to June 1963.

See also
Mount Combs

References

Peninsulas of Palmer Land